Mussorgskij is a crater on Mercury. It has a diameter of 125 kilometers. Its name was adopted by the International Astronomical Union (IAU) in 1979. Mussorgskij is named for the Russian composer Modest Mussorgsky, who lived from 1839 to 1881.

There are irregular depressions at the center of Mussorgskij, which are similar to those within Navoi, Lermontov, Scarlatti, and Praxiteles.  The depressions resemble those associated with volcanic explosions.

References

Modest Mussorgsky
Impact craters on Mercury